Versailles is a city in Morgan County, Missouri, United States. The population was 2,482 at the 2010 census. It is the county seat of Morgan County. Locally, the town's name is pronounced “Ver-sails”, rather than “Ver-seye,” as in the French pronunciation of the royal palace for which the town is named.

History
A post office called Versailles, after the royal palace near Paris, France, has been in operation since 1835. Versailles was not platted until 1854.  

The Martin Hotel, built in 1853, after the Civil War had such guests as the showman P. T. Barnum and outlaw robber Jesse James. Since the late 20th century, it has been operated as a museum. Both it and the Morgan County Courthouse are existing historic structures that are listed on the National Register of Historic Places. The courthouse was designed in a French style.

Dixon Ticonderoga, a pencil manufacturing company, had a plant in Versailles until it closed in 2005.

Geography

Climate

Demographics

2010 census
As of the census of 2010, there were 2,482 people, 1,034 households, and 590 families living in the city. The racial makeup of the city was 92.4% White, 2.8% African American, 0.8% Native American, 0.3% Asian, 1.1% from other races, and 2.6% from two or more races. Hispanic or Latino of any race were 3.1% of the population.

There were 1,034 households, of which 28.9% had children under the age of 18 living with them, 37.3% were married couples living together, 15.9% had a female householder with no husband present, 3.9% had a male householder with no wife present, and 42.9% were non-families. 38.7% of all households were made up of individuals, and 20.7% had someone living alone who was 65 years of age or older. The average household size was 2.22 and the average family size was 2.94.

The median age in the city was 40.9 years. 22.8% of residents were under the age of 18; 8.8% were between the ages of 18 and 24; 23.2% were from 25 to 44; 22.9% were from 45 to 64; and 22.4% were 65 years of age or older. The gender makeup of the city was 47.5% male and 52.5% female.

2000 census
As of the census of 2000, there were 2,565 people, 1,077 households, and 636 families living in the city. The population density was 1,115.2 people per square mile (430.6/km). There were 1,195 housing units at an average density of 519.5 per square mile (200.6/km). The racial makeup of the city was 95.40% White, 2.14% African American, 0.66% Native American, 0.04% Asian, 0.16% from other races, and 1.60% from two or more races. Hispanic or Latino of any race were 1.05% of the population.

There were 1,077 households, out of which 29.6% had children under the age of 18 living with them, 44.3% were married couples living together, 12.3% had a female householder with no husband present, and 40.9% were non-families. 36.7% of all households were made up of individuals, and 20.7% had someone living alone who was 65 years of age or older. The average household size was 2.25 and the average family size was 2.95.

In the city, the population was spread out, with 24.7% under the age of 18, 8.4% from 18 to 24, 23.4% from 25 to 44, 18.2% from 45 to 64, and 25.3% who were 65 years of age or older. The median age was 40 years. For every 100 females, there were 77.6 males. For every 100 females age 18 and over, there were 70.9 males.

The median income for a household in the city was $23,672, and the median income for a family was $31,088. Males had a median income of $24,054 versus $18,229 for females. The per capita income for the city was $14,200. About 11.4% of families and 16.5% of the population were below the poverty line, including 21.4% of those under age 18 and 10.8% of those age 65 or over.

Education
Public education in Versailles is administered by Morgan County R-II School District.

Versailles has a public library, the Morgan County Library.

Notable people
 Bud Walton (co-founder of Walmart)
 Bill Laurie (executive)
 Dwight Bolinger (linguist)
 William E. Morris
 June Rae Wood (author)
 Joseph Franklin Rutherford (Jehovah's Witness preacher and second president of the Watch Tower Bible & Tract Society)

References

External links
 Historic maps of Versailles in the Sanborn Maps of Missouri Collection at the University of Missouri

Cities in Morgan County, Missouri
Cities in Missouri
County seats in Missouri